Peter Kirby (born December 17, 1931) is a Canadian bobsledder who competed in the mid-1960s. He won a gold medal in the four-man event at the 1964 Winter Olympics in Innsbruck. He was born in Montreal, Quebec.

Kirby also won a gold medal in the four-man event at the 1965 FIBT World Championships in St. Moritz. He worked as a geologist until his retirement.

References
 Bobsleigh four-man Olympic medalists for 1924, 1932-56, and since 1964
 Bobsleigh four-man world championship medalists since 1930

Bobsledders at the 1964 Winter Olympics
Canadian male bobsledders
Olympic bobsledders of Canada
Olympic gold medalists for Canada
1931 births
Living people
Sportspeople from Montreal
Anglophone Quebec people
Olympic medalists in bobsleigh
Medalists at the 1964 Winter Olympics